Octostigma is a small genus of diplurans, placed in its own family, Octostigmatidae. It contains three recognized species:
 Octostigma herbivora Rusek, 1982
 Octostigma sinensis Xie & Yang, 1991
 Octostigma spiniferum Pagés, 2001

References

Diplura